The Philips Velo was a Handheld PC.

Velo 1 

The initial Velo 1 was a PDA device released by Philips in August 1997. The device was typical of the HPCs at the time, being powered by two AA batteries or a rechargeable NiMH battery pack. The device had a green back-lit 5.1-inch resistive touchscreen with a resolution of 480×240 pixels at two bits per pixel which allowed for the display of four shades of grey (16 shades with Windows CE 2.0 upgrade). It originally shipped with Windows CE 1.0, with a ROM upgrade to Windows CE 2.0 that customers could order for $99.99. Expandability was via two internal 'miniature' expansion slots, as well as a PCMCIA slot in the docking station.

The standard model included 4 MB of RAM and 5 MB ROM. An 8 MB model with NiMH battery pack was also available for $839.99 with a free upgrade to Windows CE 2.0 when it was available.

Unlike most other HPCs, the Velo 1 included a built-in low-power software modem, where most other devices required a PCMCIA card modem. PCMCIA cards quickly drain batteries, so the low-power software modem helped eke out battery life. The modem operated at 14.4 kbit/s. Other communication features included an infrared (IrDa) port and serial port, both capable of a maximum transmission rate of 115,200 bit/s.

The MIPS processor in the unit made its performance snappy compared to other devices, such as the HP 300LX or HP320LX.

Velo 500 

In July, 1998 the Velo 1 was replaced by the Velo 500, which included more RAM and ROM and a much faster Philips PR31700 MIPS processor running at 75 MHz. The Velo 500 had a widescreen resolution of 620×240 pixels, which was becoming the norm. Not only did the screen feature more horizontal pixels, it now displayed in four bits per pixel, allowing 16 shades of grey to be displayed. It featured up to 24 MiB of RAM as well as an upgrade to the software modem, which operated at 28.8 kbit/s, a digital voice recorder and shipped with Windows CE 2.0.

See also
 Philips Nino

References

External links
 Philips HPC at linux-mips.org

Mobile computers
Philips products
Windows CE devices